Eugeniusz Czykwin (born 12 September 1949 in Orla) is a Polish politician. He was elected to Sejm on 25 September 2005, getting 14181 votes in 24 Białystok district as a candidate from the Democratic Left Alliance list.

He was also a member of PRL Sejm 1985-1989, PRL Sejm 1989-1991, Sejm 1991-1993, Sejm 2001-2005, Sejm 2005-2007, Sejm 2007-2011, Sejm 2011-2015, and Sejm 2019-2023).

Currently Eugeniusz Czykwin is one of the few representatives of the Belarusian ethnic minority in the Sejm of Poland.

See also
Members of Polish Sejm 2005-2007

External links
Eugeniusz Czykwin - parliamentary page - includes declarations of interest, voting record, and transcripts of speeches.
Eugeniusz Czykwin on bilingual Polish-Belarusian road signs in Podlaskie province - an interview for Radio Polonia Belarusian language edition

1949 births
Living people
People from Bielsk County
Polish people of Belarusian descent
Eastern Orthodox Christians from Poland
Christian Social Association members
Democratic Left Alliance politicians
Members of the Polish Sejm 1985–1989
Members of the Contract Sejm
Members of the Polish Sejm 1991–1993
Members of the Polish Sejm 2001–2005
Members of the Polish Sejm 2005–2007
Members of the Polish Sejm 2007–2011
Members of the Polish Sejm 2011–2015
Members of the Polish Sejm 2019–2023
Warsaw University of Technology alumni